Salinas Canton is a canton of Ecuador, located in the Santa Elena Province.  Its capital is the town of Salinas.  Its population at the 2001 census was 49,572. The mayor attractions of this city is the high natural, partying and funcreating resources that it counts with. The actual governor of this city is Paul Borbor Mite who was elected by a democratic process in 2008.

Demographics
Ethnic groups as of the Ecuadorian census of 2010:
Mestizo  81.8%
Afro-Ecuadorian  8.2%
White  5.1%
Montubio  3.1%
Indigenous  0.2%
Other  1.9%

References

Cantons of Santa Elena Province